Audentes Sports Centre is a multi-purpose indoor arena complex in Tallinn. The sports center has a swimming pool, gym, track&field arena, ball halls, a wrestling and judo hall and a tennis center..

It's located in Tondi, a subdistrict of Kristiine.

References

External links
Official website 

Sports venues in Estonia
Basketball venues in Estonia
Indoor arenas in Estonia
Sports venues in Tallinn
Athletics (track and field) venues in Estonia
Volleyball venues in Estonia